"Last Ditch Cabaret" is a song written and performed by Australian singer-songwriter, Mark Seymour. The song was released in May 1997 as the lead single from his debut studio album, King Without a Clue. The song peaked at number 85 on the ARIA singles chart.

At the ARIA Music Awards of 1997, the song was nominated for two awards; Best Male Artist and Breakthrough Artist – Single.

Track listing
CD single
 "Last Ditch Cabaret" – 4:08
 "Until They Die" – 4:11	
 "The Ghost of Vainglory" (live acoustic version) – 4:13
 "The Patriot Game" (live acoustic version) – 4:13
 "Last Ditch Cabaret" (live acoustic version) – 4:27

Charts

Release history

References

1997 songs
Mushroom Records singles